The Riozinho River is a river of Amazonas state in north-western Brazil.
It is a tributary of the Jutaí River.

The Riozinho River forms the eastern boundary of the  Rio Jutaí Extractive Reserve, flowing north to join the Jutaí River.

See also
List of rivers of Amazonas

References

Sources

Rivers of Amazonas (Brazilian state)